Kandiyohi is a city in Kandiyohi County, Minnesota, United States. The population was 491 at the 2010 census.

History
Kandiyohi was laid out in 1869, when the railroad was extended to that point. In 1869 the Minnesota legislature voted Kandiyohi to be the new state capital due to its central location. The bill was vetoed by governor William Rainey Marshall on the grounds that "[t]he western treeless districts" further out from Kandiyohi would place the capital away from the likely population center.

Kandiyohi was derived from a Sioux name meaning "where the buffalo fish come from".

Geography
Including five family-friendly parks.

U.S. Route 12 serves as a main route in the community.

Demographics

2010 census
As of the census of 2010, there were 491 people, 202 households, and 130 families living in the city. The racial makeup of the city was 92.5% White, 0.4% Native American, 0.4% Asian, 3.5% from other races, and 3.3% from two or more races. Hispanic or Latino of any race were 5.7% of the population.

There were 202 households, of which 33.7% had children under the age of 18 living with them, 53.0% were married couples living together, 9.4% had a female householder with no husband present, 2.0% had a male householder with no wife present, and 35.6% were non-families. 28.7% of all households were made up of individuals, and 8.9% had someone living alone who was 65 years of age or older. The average household size was 2.42 and the average family size was 3.02.

The median age in the city was 32.6 years. 28.1% of residents were under the age of 18; 9.8% were between the ages of 18 and 24; 26.2% were from 25 to 44; 24.4% were from 45 to 64; and 11.4% were 65 years of age or older. The gender makeup of the city was 50.5% male and 49.5% female.

2000 census
As of the census of 2000, there were 555 people, 215 households, and 147 families living in the city. The racial makeup of the city was 97.84% White, 0.54% African American, 0.18% Native American, 0.18% Asian, 0.90% from other races, and 0.36% from two or more races. Hispanic or Latino of any race were 1.62% of the population.

There were 215 households, out of which 40.5% had children under the age of 18 living with them, 57.2% were married couples living together, 7.9% had a female householder with no husband present, and 31.2% were non-families. 24.7% of all households were made up of individuals, and 9.8% had someone living alone who was 65 years of age or older. The average household size was 2.57 and the average family size was 3.09.

In the city, the population was spread out, with 29.5% under the age of 18, 15.9% from 18 to 24, 27.9% from 25 to 44, 15.5% from 45 to 64, and 11.2% who were 65 years of age or older. The median age was 28 years. For every 100 females, there were 92.7 males. For every 100 females age 18 and over, there were 91.7 males.

The median income for a household in the city was $36,364, and the median income for a family was $52,500. Males had a median income of $32,045 versus $19,659 for females. The per capita income for the city was $15,897. About 3.4% of families and 5.2% of the population were below the poverty line, including 1.3% of those under age 18 and 6.5% of those age 65 or over.

Notable people
Mary Lou Freeman, Iowa state legislator, was born in Kandiyohi.
Eugene Peter Knudsen, Minnesota state legislator and farmer, lived in Kandiyohi.

References

Cities in Minnesota
Cities in Kandiyohi County, Minnesota
Dakota toponyms